Lincoln School, also known as the Lincoln Consolidated Rosenwald School, is a former African-American school in Pikeville, Tennessee, that is listed on the National Register of Historic Places.

The school was built in 1925 with assistance from the Rosenwald Fund to house a black school that previously had been located in the Pikeville Chapel African Methodist Episcopal Zion Church. The building design is characteristic of a Rosenwald school, with a gable roof, tall narrow batteries of windows, and short piers. The school operated until 1965, educating children from kindergarten through grade 8. It was listed on the National Register in 1993.

References

School buildings on the National Register of Historic Places in Tennessee
School buildings completed in 1925
Buildings and structures in Bledsoe County, Tennessee
Historically segregated African-American schools in Tennessee
Rosenwald schools in Tennessee
National Register of Historic Places in Bledsoe County, Tennessee
1925 establishments in Tennessee